Kevin Krawietz and Andreas Mies were the defending champions but chose not to defend their title.

Nathaniel Lammons and Jackson Withrow won the title after defeating André Göransson and Sem Verbeek 6–7(4–7), 6–4, [10–8] in the final.

Seeds

Draw

References

External links
 Main draw

Heilbronner Neckarcup - Doubles
2021 Doubles